Valentyna Ivanivna Danishevska (born 23 March 1957) is a Ukrainian lawyer, and judge. She is the first woman to hold the position of the Head of the Supreme Court of Ukraine.

Danishevska is from Zaporizhzhia Oblast. She graduated law faculty of the Odessa University in 1983. Her career Danishevska started by working for various government enterprises legal departments. By late 1980s she became an arbiter at first at the commerce department of the Zaporizhzhia Oblast State Administration and since 1992 at the Zaporizhzhia Oblast Arbitration court.

In 2000s Danishevska worked for Deloitte as a director of the Center of Commerce Law.

In 2016 she was elected a judge of arbitration court of the Supreme Court of Ukraine. In 2017 Danishevska was selected as a chairwoman of the Supreme Court of Ukraine. During the voting she earned 67 votes of 111 participants. Danishevska was elected on the term of four years.

References

External links
 Valentyna Danishevska at the Official Ukraine Today

1957 births
Living people
People from Zaporizhzhia
Odesa University alumni
Ukrainian women lawyers
21st-century Ukrainian lawyers
Ukrainian jurists
Judges of the Supreme Court of Ukraine
21st-century women lawyers
Laureates of the Honorary Diploma of the Verkhovna Rada of Ukraine
Women chief justices